Sergei Vladimirovich Sipatov (born 8 February 1993) is a Russian football forward. He plays for FC Zugdidi.

Club career
He made his debut in the Russian Second Division for FC Gornyak Uchaly on 18 April 2013 in a game against FC Tyumen.

He made his Russian Football National League debut for FC Krylia Sovetov Samara on 19 October 2014 in a game against FC Sakhalin Yuzhno-Sakhalinsk.

References

External links
 
 Career summary by sportbox.ru
 
 

1993 births
Sportspeople from Tolyatti
Living people
Russian footballers
Russia youth international footballers
FC Gornyak Uchaly players
PFC Krylia Sovetov Samara players
FC Tosno players
FC Oryol players
PFC CSKA Moscow players
Association football forwards
FC Moscow players
FC Zugdidi players
Russian expatriate footballers
Expatriate footballers in Georgia (country)